Esther Howard (April 4, 1892 – March 8, 1965) was an American stage and film character actress who played a wide range of supporting roles, from man-hungry spinsters to amoral criminals, appearing in 108 films in her 23-year screen career.

Early life
Howard was born in Butte, Montana on April 4, 1892 to Martha Esther Howard (née Boggs) and James Howard Jr., a music teacher who was employed as the conductor of the Butte Opera House. Her paternal grandfather, James Howard Sr., was a prominent physician from California who had established a medical practice in Butte and Dillon, Montana, and at one time served as the coroner of Silver Bow County. When Howard was five years old, her family relocated to Boston, Massachusetts, where her father had lived prior to relocating to Montana. In Boston, Howard attended the Girls' Latin School.

Career

Howard began her stage career performing in stock theater in Lynn, Massachusetts, before making her Broadway debut in 1917 in a play called Eve's Daughter, which was not a success. Over the next twelve years she performed on Broadway in eleven more comedies and musicals, including the hit shows Wildflower (1923) and The New Moon (1929), which was her final Broadway production.

In 1930, Miss Howard was still slender and beautiful when she changed her focus to making movies, appearing in a Vitaphone comedy short, The Victim (1930). From that point until her retirement in 1952, she worked regularly – at least one film she appeared in was released every year. She was often cast as an oversexed dowager, a decrepit old hag, and occasionally, a glamorous society dame.  Known for her versatility and expressive face, notable among her many roles were the gorgeous Miss Prescott in Meet the Mayor (1932), frowsy Jessie Florian in Raymond Chandler's Murder My Sweet (1944), an aunt who has a crush on Oliver Hardy in Laurel and Hardy's The Big Noise (1944), diner waitress Holly in Detour (1945), bawdy Filthy Flora in Dick Tracy vs. Cueball (1946), the determined Mrs. Kraft out to solve a murder in Born to Kill (1947), and as Kirk Douglas' mother in Champion (1949). Miss Howard's lovely singing voice was used to ghost sing (dub in) for bigger-name stars who had no singing talent, but she never sang onscreen for herself.

From 1940 to 1949, Howard was part of Preston Sturges' unofficial "stock company" of character actors, appearing in seven films written and directed by Sturges. From 1937, Howard was a regular player in short-subjects produced at Columbia Pictures, where she was frequently cast opposite comedian Andy Clyde. Her last film was a Columbia comedy short, Caught on the Bounce (1952), in which she played Joe Besser's aunt.

Death
Howard died of a heart attack in Los Angeles, California, on March 8, 1965, aged 72. She is buried in Forest Lawn Memorial Park in Glendale, California.

Selected filmography

 The Vice Squad (1931) – Josie
 Wicked (1931) – Minor Role (uncredited)
 The Yellow Ticket (1931) – Prisoner (uncredited)
 Ladies of the Big House (1931) – Clara Newman
 A Fool's Advice (1932) – Mrs. Prescott
 The Cohens and Kellys in Hollywood (1932) – Mrs. Maggie Kelly
 Merrily We Go to Hell (1932) – Vi
 Winner Take All (1932) – Ann – Joan's Friend
 Life Begins (1932) – Mrs. Tubby's Friend (uncredited)
 Rackety Rax (1932) – 'Sister' Carrie
 Second Hand Wife (1933) – Mrs. Trumbull (uncredited)
 The Iron Master (1933) – Mrs. Stillman
 Grand Slam (1933) – Mary (uncredited)
 Sweepings (1933) – Violet's Madame (uncredited)
 Below the Sea (1933) – Lily
 Cockeyed Cavaliers (1934) – Robert's Serving Girl (uncredited)
 Transatlantic Merry-Go-Round (1934) – Passenger Needing 'Hooking' (uncredited)
 Ready for Love (1934) – Aunt Ida
 The Best Man Wins (1935) – Mamie (uncredited)
 Death Flies East (1935) – Mitzi (uncredited)
 Straight from the Heart (1935) – Tired Mother (uncredited)
 The Farmer Takes a Wife (1935) – Klore's New Cook (uncredited)
 Stars Over Broadway (1935) – Mary Sporesgate (uncredited)
 Klondike Annie (1936) – Fanny Radler
 Florida Special (1936) – Flirtatious Dowager (uncredited)
 M'Liss (1936) – Rose
 Swing High, Swing Low (1937) – Beauty Salon Customer (uncredited)
 Rhythm in the Clouds (1937) – Mrs. Madigan
 Dead End (1937) – Neighbor with Coarse Voice (uncredited)
 Partners in Crime (1937) – Mrs. Wagon
 Stand-In (1937) – Mrs. Mack (uncredited)
 Scandal Street (1938) – Birdie Brown
 Rebecca of Sunnybrook Farm (1938) – Mother (uncredited)
 Marie Antoinette (1938) – Streetwalker (uncredited)
 The Texans (1938) – Madame (uncredited)
 Five of a Kind (1938) – Thelma – Mother in Hoax (uncredited)
 Swing, Sister, Swing (1938) – Miss Fredericks
 Broadway Serenade (1939) – Mrs. Fellows
 Missing Daughters (1939) – Mother Hawks (uncredited)
 The Gracie Allen Murder Case (1939) – Florist (uncredited)
 The Great McGinty (1940) – Madame Juliette La Jolla
 The San Francisco Docks (1940) – Jean (uncredited)
 The Lady from Cheyenne (1941) – Landlady (uncredited)
 Sullivan's Travels (1941) – Miz Zeffie
 Sappy Birthday (1942, Short) – Mrs. Andy 'Martha' Clyde
 My Favorite Blonde (1942) – Mrs. Topley
 Jackass Mail (1942) – Dancehall Girl (uncredited)
 Tales of Manhattan (1942) – Woman Bumming Cigarette from Joe (Robinson sequence) (uncredited)
 The Palm Beach Story (1942) – Wife of Wienie King
 I Married a Witch (1942) – Extra (uncredited)
 The Miracle of Morgan's Creek (1943) – Sally (uncredited)
 True to Life (1943) – Bit Role (uncredited)
 Once Upon a Time (1944) – Clerk (uncredited)
 The Great Moment (1944) – Dr. Wells' Patient (uncredited)
 Hail the Conquering Hero (1944) – Mrs. Everett J. Noble (uncredited)
 The Big Noise (1944) – Aunt Sophie (uncredited)
 San Diego, I Love You (1944) – Mother (uncredited)
 Murder, My Sweet (1944) – Jessie Florian
 The Great Flamarion (1945) – Cleo
 Detour (1945) – Diner Waitress
 Adventure (1945) – Blister (uncredited)
 A Letter for Evie (1946) – Mrs. Edgewaters
 The Hoodlum Saint (1946) – Elderly Spectator (uncredited)
 The Falcon's Alibi (1946) – Gloria Peabody
 The Virginian (1946) – Mother of Student (uncredited)
 Without Reservations (1946) – Sarah (uncredited)
 Dick Tracy vs. Cueball (1946) – Filthy Flora
 Mr. District Attorney (1947) – Bit Role (uncredited)
 Born to Kill (1947) – Mrs. Kraft
 The Trouble with Women (1947) – Mrs. Fogarty (uncredited)
 Song of the Thin Man (1947) – Sadie – Counterwoman (uncredited)
 The Velvet Touch (1948) – Pansy Dupont
 June Bride (1948) – Mrs. Mitchell (uncredited)
 Homicide (1949) – Mrs. Brucker -Landlady
 Champion (1949) – Mrs. Kelly
 The Crooked Way (1949) – Hotel Proprietess (uncredited)
 The Lady Gambles (1949) – Gross Lady
 The Beautiful Blonde from Bashful Bend (1949) – Mrs. Smidlap
 Hellfire (1949) – Birdie
 Look for the Silver Lining (1949) – Mrs. Moffitt (uncredited)
 No Man of Her Own (1950) – Boarding House Owner (uncredited)
 Caged (1950) – Grace (uncredited)
 All That I Have (1951) – Mrs. Dalton
 Rose of Cimarron (1952) – Ma Bruce (uncredited)
 Lady in the Iron Mask (1952) – Madame Duprez (uncredited)

References

Other sources

External links

 
 
 
 

1892 births
1965 deaths
Actresses from Boston
Actresses from Montana
American film actresses
American stage actresses
Actresses from Butte, Montana
20th-century American actresses